Jenn Lindsay (born October 18, 1978, in Amarillo, Texas) is an American social scientist, adjunct professor of Sociology and Communications, documentary filmmaker, video journalist and singer-songwriter currently based in Rome, Italy. Her work focuses on the exploration of social diversity, community building, personal transformation, and social change movements.

She has produced and directed eight documentary feature-length and short subject films, among which the award-winning Quarantined Faith, and co-founded the production company So Fare Films in 2016. She is also an anti-folk singer-songwriter, having produced ten studio albums under her label No Evil Star Records (2001-2011).

She earned a BA in playwriting (2001) from Stanford University, including a study abroad in playwriting and directing at the Liverpool Institute for Performing Arts in 2000, and attended the arts management MFA program at Yale School of Drama (2004–2005) but did not graduate. She earned a Master of Divinity (M.Div.) in Interfaith Relations and Ecumenism from Union Theological Seminary of Columbia University (2011) and completed an advanced diploma course in Sociological Methods and Theories jointly administered by Roma Tre University, Sapienza University and Tor Vergata University (2017). She completed her Ph.D. in 2018 at Boston University in the Graduate Division of Religious Studies, under adviser Nancy Ammerman. She is currently a professor of Sociology and Communications at John Cabot University, and also teaches at the Rome campuses of St. John's University (New York City), the University of California Education Abroad Program, and Richmond University.

Biography
Jenn Lindsay was born in Amarillo, Texas and moved with her family to San Diego, California at the age of two. From 1985 to 1990 she was involved in musical theater productions with San Diego County's Christian Youth Theater and Christian Community Theater.

She lived in New York City from 2001 to 2011, in Boston 2011–2014, and in 2014 moved to Rome to work at Confronti Magazine and conduct doctoral research on interfaith dialogue in Italy and the Middle East.

At the age of 13, Lindsay followed her curiosity about her Jewish heritage into commitment to progressive Judaism, formally converting at age 17. Her Jewish involvement began at the Stanford University Hillel. In the summer of 2001, she worked as the Program Director at Lights in Action. From 2007 to 2008, she was a Development Associate at Congregation Beit Simchat Torah. In Summer 2008, she was the Music Director at a B'nai B'rith Youth Organization summer camp near Milwaukee. From 2011 to 2013, she was the teacher for the Bar/Bat Mitzvah year of the Boston Workmen's Circle Sunday School. In Rome, she has written about her involvement in the emergent progressive Jewish community Beth Hillel.

Filmmaking career 
Between 2005 and 2008, Jenn Lindsay worked in the film and music industries as a documentary filmmaker, film editor and composer at MTV, the Sundance Channel, and several independent post-production facilities, serving as an Assistant Story Editor on the MTV reality show 8th and Ocean, Atmosphere Picture's Trek Nation, a biographical documentary about Star Trek creator Gene Roddenberry. She worked as an Assistant Editor with Zak Tucker on The Garden (Harbor Picture), previously known as Body & Soul by Swede Films. She was the founder and producing director of Get Thee to a Nunnery Productions, her independent film production company (2005-2017), and in 2016, she conceptualized So Fare Films in Rome with other female filmmakers, the production company she is currently directing.

In 2011, she wrote, produced and directed Jilbab, a 36-minute documentary on veiling trends for Muslim women in Jogjakarta Indonesia. It has screened in many Boston University classrooms, as well as in the Muslim Women and the Challenge of Authority Lecture Series (Boston 2011), the American Academy of Religion Mid-Atlantic Regional Meeting (Rutgers NJ 2012), the American Academy of Religion Annual Meeting Film Series, Chicago 2012), and the International Society for the Sociology of Religion Film Series (Turku, Finland 2013).

In July 2012, she headed a film team to produce a short film about the International Political Camp at Agape Centro Ecumenico, featuring interviews with community members, eco-activists, scientists, and conference organizers, about environmental activism and the larger issue of grassroots activism and communities.

Between 2013–2018, Lindsay was the staff documentarian for the Center for Mind and Culture and the Institute for the Bio-Cultural Study of Religion, producing short films for CMAC and IBCSR about the ongoing projects of the center, thematically centered around the scientific study of religion, the nexus of brain, mind, and culture, and interdisciplinary scholarship.

During that period, she completed From Alef to Zayin: A Secular Jewish Education (2013), a 21-minute documentary about bar mitzvah students at a secular humanist Jewish community, an educational video meant to stimulate thinking about the role of Jewish identity, the idea of non-religious Judaism, and a data sample of how the kids understand and negotiate their own identities. It screened in San Diego, California at the Society for Psychological Anthropology/Anthropology of Children and Youth Interest Group Annual Meeting in January 2013, and at the International Society for the Sociology of Religion in Louvain-la-Neuve, Belgium, in July 2015.

In 2015, she completed IBCSR: The Institute for the Bio-Cultural Study of Religion (2015), a 52-minute feature documentary about the Institute for the Bio-Cultural Study of Religion in Boston. Lindsay uses documentary film techniques to explore and explain the Institute's various research projects. It broaches the scientific study of religion, interdisciplinary research, the complexity of "religion" as a study object, the dialogues between religion and science.

Then, she worked on Il Presepe di Calcata (2016), a 21-minute ethnographic documentary film about the Italian village of Calcata and its eccentric residents, and chiefly follows the handmade Nativity scene (presepe in Italian) of the Dutch sculptor Marijcke van der Maden, a resident of Calcata since 1984.

In 2020, Lindsay produced the award-winning documentary film Quarantined Faith about the suspension of religious gatherings in Rome due to the COVID-19 national lockdown in Italy during the period of Passover, Easter, and Ramadan.

Also, in 2020, Lindsay produced a short collection of video journalism called Quarantena alla Romana which was selected for screening by the COVIDaVINCI Film Festival and the X World Short Film Festival.

As of 2022, Jenn Lindsay is in production with: The Modeling Religion Project, Minding Shadows and ShalOM, and in post-production with the documentary Simulating Religious Violence.

• The Modeling Religion Project is an 8-episode docuseries about how scholars understand religion, how computer models help us understand the world we live in, and the art of working together across disciplines.

• Minding Shadows is a documentary that tells the story of a Buddhist monk from Africa who survived the Rwandan genocide in 1994 and grew up to teach mindfulness and healing practices globally.

• ShalOM is a documentary partially funded by KAICIID Dialogue Centre that recounts the story of dialogues between world leaders of Judaism and Hinduism between 2007 and 2009.

• Simulating Religious Violence is a documentary film about how computer simulation can reveal solutions to worldwide humanitarian crises, following an international crew of computer scientists and religion scholars that develop a technology to prevent terrorist attacks.

Jenn Lindsay has written about her use of documentary film as an anthropological method and how she uses her films as classroom teaching tools.

Awards won by Quarantined Faith 

 Special Jury Award for the theme of “Migrations and Coexistence": 23rd Edition of the Religion Today Film Festival
 Best Documentary, Best Message, Best Foreign Film: Christian Online Film Festival.
 Best Documentary: Picasso Einstein Buddha International Film Festival
 Honorable Mention for Best Short Documentary: Florence Film Awards
 Honorable Mention for Best Documentary: Madras International Film Festival
 Finalist for Best Documentary: Luleå International Film Festival
 Semi-Finalist for Best Documentary: International Moving Film Festival
 Semi-Finalist for Best Documentary: Eurasia Fest
 Award of Recognition: Impact DOCS

Social Scientific Research 
Jenn Lindsay completed her PhD in Religion and Society at Boston University in 2018. Her advisor was the prominent sociologist Nancy Ammerman. She studied Interfaith Relations and Ecumenics (MDiv '11) at Union Theological Seminary at Columbia University in New York City, where in 2009 and 2010 she was co-chair of the Interfaith Caucus and the Chair of Student Activities. Her research concerns religious and social diversity and interreligious dialogue. Her website reports that Jenn Lindsay "uses her research and films to encourage reflection about religion ‘outside the box,’ fostering interreligious collaboration and healthier human exchanges, and educating individuals and religious leaders about the realities and demands of ‘street-level pluralism’ in increasingly diverse communities.”

Lindsay started her career as an investigative fieldworker in 1998 in the Peruvian highlands, where she wrote about Andean woman's rural lives and their use of religious symbols and rituals to order their lives. This fieldwork explored the field of ethnoastronomy with indigenous communities in Northern Peru, charting how locals combine naturistic Pachamama spirit imagery with imported Catholic images to interpret celestial phenomena such as constellations, eclipses, and weather patterns. In 2010 she lived for four months in Jogjakarta, Indonesia and conducted ethnographic research on Catholic/Muslim couples in Central Java. In Summer 2012 she was sponsored by the American Society for Psychological Anthropology to study intermarriage among Roman Jews.

In Spring 2013 she was the Boston University Film Society's Featured Lecturer for the "Religion and Film Series.”

Between 2010 and 2014 Jenn Lindsay was a member of the planning committee for the International Political Camp at Agape Centro Ecumenico, an ecumenical center in Northern Italy with roots in post-WWII peace movement. In July 2012 as a guest lecturer to the International Theological Camp to deliver a lecture entitled "Howard Thurman, Mysticism, and Social Action.”

For her PhD dissertation fieldwork, revolving around interfaith dialogue activity in the city of Rome, in 2014 and 2015 Lindsay was based at the Roman intercultural magazine Confronti, travelling for press tours in partnership with Holy Land Trust throughout Palestine and Israel.

Writing 
Journalism and academic writing

Since 2011 Jenn Lindsay has been a featured Contributing Scholar of State of Formation, the online platform of the Journal of Inter-religious Studies. Lindsay's frequent articles for articles for State of Formation explore religious, theological, social, and psychological themes. In July 2012 she was named Writer of the Month for an article she published about multiple religious belonging. Her piece on the election of Pope France was the site's Featured Article of March 2013.

In 2015 she wrote for the magazine Confronti, and that same year started publishing peer-reviewed journal articles on topics spanning interreligious dialogue, intercultural competence, and documentary filmmaking as a tool of social change.

Playwriting 
	
In 2001 Jenn Lindsay received a degree in playwriting from Stanford University. Her plays feature strong female characters exploring themes of history, memory, fear, and sexuality. Her play The Grandmother Project was supported in development by a Stanford Humanities Major Grant in Playwriting and the Stanford University Jewish Studies Program, as well as private Jewish family donors form the Bay Area. The play was produced in February 2001 by Highlighter's Theatre Troupe at Stanford University, in April 2001 at the British National Student Drama Festival in Scarborough UK, and in August 2001 as a staged reading by A Traveling Jewish Theatre in San Francisco, CA. 
	
Her play The History of a Liar was produced in January 2001 by Ram's Head Theatrical Society at Stanford University and featured fellow Stanford University alumni Danny Jacobs and Kathryn Sigismund. Her play Body of Work was produced as a staged reading in March 2001 by the Stanford University Feminist Studies Program. Her play The Gala was produced in May 2000 at the Liverpool Institute for the Performing Arts in Liverpool UK.
	
In 2001 she received Commendations for Playwriting and Acting from the British National Student Drama Festival, and a recognition for Meritorious Contribution to Playwriting by the American College Theater Festival: Meritorious Contribution to Playwriting. In 2000 she received a Commendation for Excellent Drama Criticism from the British National Student Drama Festival.

Music career 
Lindsay released her tenth studio album Allora Eccola in 2014. Nine of her ten albums were released on her own record label No Evil Star Records, but her fifth record was released through Waterbug Records, an artists' cooperative record label based in Chicago, run by Andrew Calhoun. She has shared the stage with Regina Spektor, Jeffrey Lewis, Kimya Dawson, Alix Olson, Chris Barron, Erin McKeown, Lach, Girlyman and Toshi Reagon, primarily through her association with the anti-folk music scene based in the East Village of New York City. According to her website, Jenn plays music "for the jobless, the brave, and the indignant." Her music is featured on compilation albums by the ACLU, SBS Records, Waterbug Records, and Stanford University. Her song "White Room" is used as the theme song to "Something Blue," a television pilot by Brooklyn filmmaker Emily Millay Haddad. Lindsay recorded all but her first and tenth albums with Major Matt Mason USA of the New York anti-folk scene, and works frequently with Bryant Moore (Sneaky Theieves, Bryant Moore and the Celestial Shore) on drum and bass arrangements.

At Grossmont High School Jenn Lindsay sang in the Red Robe Choir under the tutelage of Edwin Basilio, and she played in a folk band with her calculus teacher Robert Ridgway, covering artists such as Simon and Garfunkel, James Taylor, the Indigo Girls, and the Beatles. She started writing songs after attending the Lilith Fair in 1998 and resolving to join the ranks of the featured female singer-songwriters. Her songwriting attracted attention when she was a student at Stanford University, where she headlined Take Back the Night Marches and taught songwriting to victims of domestic abuse at the Peninsula YMCA in the Bay Area. Jenn Lindsay started gigging professionally at age 19 while on a "year abroad" in the acting program at the Liverpool Institute of Performing Arts. She moved to New York City in 2001 and was named the "best female singer-songwriter in NYC" by online radio station Radio Crystal Blue. Since Jenn started touring nationally, she has played her songs in exchange for free catfish in Alabama, sang to a room full of friendly cowgirls in Amarillo Texas, entertained in Vegas, and played encores to Ladyfest attendees in Memphis, Brooklyn, Santa Cruz and Ottawa. In addition to appearing at universities and coffee shops, Jenn has played LadyFests, BMI Showcases, the New York Songwriters Circle, political rallies at Rockefeller Center, and many bars and coffee shops throughout North America.

Lindsay's sixth through tenth studio albums were financed by her fans. She writes that her album Uphill Both Ways is, "A declaration of independence, a love letter, a primal scream, and a homecoming announcement. It’s a pageant of change, growing up, grief, and the little things that get us out of bed in the morning." One of the hallmarks of Jenn Lindsay's work is the grassroots, low-fi set up of Olive Juice Studios, where the drum kit rests on a bedspread, the microphone pop filter is a sock stretched over a coat hanger, and percussion sounds include apples and a pen dragged over the wire of a spiral notebook. To keep costs down on her albums Uphill Both Ways, Perfect Handful and A For Effort, Jenn Lindsay learned to play as many instruments as she could: the guitar, piano, banjo, baritone ukulele, mandolin, drums, keyboard, xylophone, the Vietnamese dan mo, the marxophone, harmonica and tambourine. The most difficult, she says, was the tambourine.

“Something good has to come out of the current economic downturn, right? Well, here’s one: anti-folk singer-songwriter Jenn Lindsay.” (Amy Phillips, Village Voice) Smother.net remarks, "Jenn Lindsay has her finger right on the pulse of the whole wide world of working people everywhere." Rambles Magazine said "If some of her songs were given the exposure that they deserve, New York would be one receptionist short but the folk world would be one star richer," the impoverished struggle of being a solo artist in NYC sent Jenn out onto the road, booking her own shows, leading college workshops, and forming traveling collectives with other emerging artists. In NYC, Jenn's musical community is the anti-folk scene, a hub of musicians based in the East Village's Sidewalk Cafe, who share a mutual distaste for well-packaged mainstream music. Her music, "delicate and tough...stark urban imagery" (San Diego Union-Tribune), showcases "a talent well-versed in the field of social protest music"(Stanford Daily).

Her music appears on a number of compilation albums: “Loving the Fair” is included on the Stanford University LGBTQ-CRC Center Compilation (September 2002). “Athena” is included on the SUNY Binghamton: Best Bands!, released by the SUNYB Activities Council (October 2002). “Red Shirt” is on Study Break: Best of Stanford Musicians, released by the Stanford Activities Council (April 2002). “Not a Sound (featuring Roland Marconi)” is on A Chance for Peace after 9/11, released by Educators for Social Justice (November 2002). “Close” is on the Waterbug Anthology 7, released out of Chicago by Waterbug music as an introductions to the musicians affiliated with the label (July 2004). “Jill and Jill” is included on Marry Me, released by the American Civil Liberties Union (ACLU) to support GLBT couples seeking to marry (November 2004). “White Room” is on the SBS Records #9 Sampler, a compilation put out by musicians Michele Malone and Amy Ray of the Indigo Girls, released nationally in September 2005. “I Am Not Going Home Yet” and “The Well” are included on I, Even I, Will Sing, a compilation of student musicians from Union Theological Seminary (Spring 2011). In July 2006 Jenn Lindsay composed scores for two ten-minute industrial films for Price Waterhouse Coopers. In 2015 Confronti Magazine used her song "The Bird" from the album Allora Eccola in their short video about a demolished Palestinian home outside Bethlehem.

Filmography 

 The Garden (2005)
 8th & Ocean (2006)
 Holy Wisdom Monastery (2010)
 Trek Nation (2011)
 Occupy Boston: Occupy Religion (2011)
 Jilbab: The Indonesian Headscarf (2011)
 Agape International (2012)
 From Alef to Zayin (2013)
 IBCSR: The Institute for the Bio-Cultural Study of Religion (2015)
 Il Presepe di Calcata (2016)
 Quarantined Faith: Rome, Religion and Coronavirus (2020)
 Quarantine alla Romana (2020)

In production or post-production:

 The Modeling Religion Project
 Minding Shadows
 ShalOM
 Simulating Religious Violence

Publications 
Peer-reviewed journal articles
 “Growing Interreligious and Intercultural Competence in the Classroom.” Teaching Theology & Religion, vol. 23, no. 1, 5 Mar. 2020, pp. 17–33., doi:10.1111/teth.12527.
 “Interfaith Dialogue and Humanization of the Religious Other: Discourse and Action.” International Journal of Interreligious and Intercultural Studies 3 (2), 1-24. https://doi.org/10.32795/ijiis.vol3.iss2.2020.691.
 “Creative Dialogue in Rome, Italy: Thinking Beyond Discourse-Based Interfaith Engagement.” Dialogue Studies     (forthcoming in Winter 2021). “The Interfaith Society: A Durkheimian Analysis of Interfaith Engagement.” Journal of Interreligious Studies (forthcoming in Winter 2021).

Books

 The Law Is Made to Be Broken: Interfaith Marriage in Jogjakarta, Indonesia. LAP Lambert Academic Publishing. 2020.
 Pluralismo Vivo: Lived Religious Pluralism and Interfaith Dialogue in Rome. LIT Verlag, Munich. 2021.

Book chapters

 “Confronti: A Case Study of Institutions Fostering Religious Pluralism in Rome.” Interfaith Networks and Development, Ed. Eztra Chitando. Palgrave MacMillian New York, forthcoming (2022).
 “Meaningful Interpersonal Contact: Interreligious Dialogue as a Religious Response to the Cognitive and Social Dynamics of Bias.” Religious Perspectives on a Secular World. Ed. Uzma Ashraf and Simone Raudino. Palgrave, forthcoming (2021).
 “Modeling Models: Documentary Filmmaking as a Purposeful Abstraction of the Modeling Process.” Human Simulation, Ed. Saikou Diallo and Wesley J. Wildman. Springer Press, 2019.
 “What Kind of Activist Are You? Identities and Motivations of Youth Activists.” Towards a Global Christian Movement for Eco-Justice, Ed. Shantha Ready Alonso. Indian Society for Promoting Christian Knowledge (ISPCK), 2015.

Discography
 Bring It On (2000)
 The Story of What Works (2001)
 Gotta Lotta (2002)
 Fired! (2003)
 The Last New York Horn (2004)
 Uphill Both Ways (2006)
 Perfect Handful (2006)
 A For Effort (2008)
 Prospect Hearts (2011)
 Allora Eccola (2014)

See also
 anti-folk
 Urban Folk

Footnotes

External links
 Official Jenn Lindsay Website
 CD Baby Sales Gallery
 Big Noise A&R Company Listing
 Waterbug Records Listing
 Interview in Untilmonday
 Youtube channel and Vimeo portfolio
 
 State of Formation writer’s page
 Institute for the Bio-Cultural Study of Religion video collection

American women singer-songwriters
American folk singers
Anti-folk musicians
1978 births
Living people
Yale School of Drama alumni
Stanford University alumni
Musicians from Amarillo, Texas
Alumni of the Liverpool Institute for Performing Arts
Singer-songwriters from Texas
Guitarists from Texas
21st-century American women singers
21st-century American women guitarists
21st-century American guitarists
Waterbug Records artists
21st-century American singers
Women punk rock singers